Karmsund is a strait located in Rogaland county, Norway. The strait runs through the municipalities of Haugesund, Karmøy, and Bokn. The town of Haugesund lies at the northern end of the strait and the town of Kopervik lies in the central part of the strait, and the town of Skudeneshavn lies near the southern end where the strait flows into the Boknafjorden. The Karmsund Bridge, a part of the European route E134 highway, links Karmøy to the mainland. The bridge was completed in 1955. The small islands of Vibrandsøy, Risøy, and Hasseløy lie in the strait at the northern end, just off shore from the town of Haugesund.

A local newspaper in this area is named after the strait: Karmsund Avis.

History
The eddic poem Grímnismál says that Thor, the weather god, wades the straits at Karmsund every morning on his way to Yggdrasil, the tree of life.

Standing above Karmsund, near Haugesund, is Haraldshaugen, a monument commemorating the traditional burial site for several early Norwegian rulers, including Harald I.

The professor in philology Magnus Olsen wrote that the name of the country Norway, which means the northbound route, refers to the inner-archipelago sailing route, which begins at Karmsund, and originally to the southernmost part of this sailing route, the home area of Harald Fairhair, the first king of Norway.

References

Straits of Norway
Landforms of Rogaland
Haugesund
Karmøy
Bokn